Papyrus 126 (in the Gregory-Aland numbering), designated by siglum 𝔓126, is a copy of the New Testament in Greek. It is a papyrus manuscript of the Epistle to the Hebrews.

Description 
To the present day survived only fragment from one leaf. The surviving texts of Hebrews are verses 13:12-13.19-20, they are in a fragmentary condition. The manuscript palaeographically has been assigned to the 4th century (INTF).

The text is written in one column per page, 20 lines per page (originally). The size of the fragment is 3.7 by 9.1 cm (original size ).

History 
The manuscript was announced by the Papyrological Institute in Florence in 2003. The text of the codex was published in 2008. In 2009, Claire Clivaz signaled it to the Institute for New Testament Textual Research (INTF) and the manuscript was catalogued on the INTF list of the New Testament manuscripts.

The manuscript currently is housed at the Istituto Papirologico „G. Vitelli" at Florence with the shelf number PSI inv. 1479.

See also 

 List of New Testament papyri
 Biblical manuscript

References

Further reading 

 Pubblicazioni della Società Italiana: Papiri Greci e Latini, Firenze: Le Monnier: Istituto papirologico "G. Vitelli", vol. 15, 2008.
 Claire Clivaz, “A New NT Papyrus: P126 (PSI 1497)”, Early Christianity 1 (2010).

External links 
 "Continuation of the Manuscript List" Institute for New Testament Textual Research, University of Münster. Retrieved September 8, 2009
 

New Testament papyri
4th-century biblical manuscripts
Epistle to the Hebrews papyri